2006 UEFA European Under-21 Championship was the 15th staging of UEFA's European Under-21 Championship. In December 2005, Portugal was selected to host the finals of the competition, which took place from 23 May–4 June 2006.

The finals tournament featured two groups of four, with the winners and runners up of each group going through to the semi-finals. The draw for the finals groups took place on 8 February 2006.

Qualification

The Finals
The finals took place between 23 May and 4 June 2006 in Portugal.

Venues
 Estádio Municipal de Águeda, Águeda
 Estádio Municipal de Aveiro, Aveiro
 Estádio Cidade de Barcelos, Barcelos
 Estádio Municipal de Braga, Braga
 Estádio D. Afonso Henriques, Guimarães
 Estádio do Bessa, Porto

Squads

Players born after 1 January 1983 were eligible to play.

Matches

Group stage

Group A

Group B

Knockout stage

Semi-finals

Final

Goalscorers

4 goals

 Klaas-Jan Huntelaar

3 goals

 Thomas Kahlenberg
 Nicky Hofs

2 goals

 Bryan Bergougnoux
 Ruslan Fomin
 Artem Milevskyi

1 goal

 Leon Andreasen
 Rasmus Würtz
 Julien Faubert
 Yoan Gouffran
 Rio Mavuba
 Florent Sinama Pongolle
 Jérémy Toulalan
 Eugen Polanski
 Rolando Bianchi
 Giorgio Chiellini
 Raffaele Palladino
 Alessandro Potenza
 Gijs Luirink
 Daniël de Ridder
 João Moutinho
 Branislav Ivanović

1 own goal

 Bruno Vale (against France)
 Zé Castro (against Serbia and Montenegro)

External links 
 
 Europe - U-23/U-21 Tournaments RSSSF.com

 
UEFA
UEFA European Under-21 Championship
UEFA European Under-21 Championship
International association football competitions hosted by Portugal
May 2006 sports events in Europe
June 2006 sports events in Europe
2006 in youth association football